was a Japanese voice actor. He was affiliated with Mausu Promotion.

Filmography

Anime

Film

Drama CDs

Video games

Tokusatsu
1967
The X from Outer Space (Dr. Berman (Actor by Franz Gruber)
1976
Choujin Bibyun (Sakasabashira (ep. 16))
1998
Tetsuwan Tantei Robotack (Master Ranking)
2008
Engine Sentai Go-onger (Savage Water Barbaric Machine Beast Pot Banki (ep. 14))

Dubbing roles

References

External links
 Official agency profile 
 
 
 
 Tamio Oki at Moviewalker 

1928 births
2017 deaths
Japanese male voice actors
Japanese male video game actors
Male voice actors from Tokyo
20th-century Japanese male actors
21st-century Japanese male actors
Tokyo Actor's Consumer's Cooperative Society voice actors
Mausu Promotion voice actors